Kaylene Janssen  (born 18 August 1968) is an Australian former footballer who played as a midfielder for the Australia women's national soccer team. She was part of the team at the 1994 OFC Women's Championship and 1995 FIFA Women's World Cup. At the club level, she played for Eastern Suburbs in Australia.

References

External links
 

1968 births
Living people
Australian women's soccer players
Australia women's international soccer players
Place of birth missing (living people)
1995 FIFA Women's World Cup players
Women's association football midfielders